Shri Rawatpura Sarkar University (SRU) is a private university located at the village Dhaneli in Raipur district, Chhattisgarh, India. It was established in 2018 by the Shri Rawatpura Sarkar Lok Kalyan Trust under the Chhattisgarh Private Universities (Establishmentand Operation) (Amendment) Act, 2018. The foundation stone for its campus in the village Dhaneli, in Raipur district was laid on 11 October 2018. The university offers diploma, undergraduate and postgraduate courses in the fields of engineering and technology, science, art, pharmacy, fashion and interior design, management and commerce, library science, education, yoga and naturopathy and journalism and mass communication.

References

External links
 

Raipur district
Universities in Chhattisgarh
Educational institutions established in 2018
2018 establishments in Chhattisgarh
Private universities in India